The Flims rockslide happened about 10,000 years ago (8000 BC) in eastern Switzerland. The town of Flims can be found at the line where the slip surface disappears under the debris. South of Flims is a huge hilly debris area that has been forest ever since, as this area is not suitable for farming, firstly for its shape and, even more for its lack of water. The river Rhine crosses this debris in a gorge called Ruinaulta. The Rhine still runs in debris, which shows that it has not yet reached its level as before the incident. The highest hill in the debris area is almost  higher than Flims at the end of the sliding surface.

Landscape 

The rock is Mesozoic limestone, including Mergel; the angle of slide is (only) 20° to 25°. Pressure baked the debris together to a somewhat stable rock. This debris dammed the Vorderrhein and created a lake in the Ilanz area.

Dating 
Clemens Augenstein from Geologisches Institut der ETH Zürich explored with Professor Flavio Anselmetti the sediments at a small lake called Dachlisee at  near Obersaxen. They were looking for dust, as an incident of this size would have produced a giant dust cloud. Drilling five times into the sediment they found embedded limestone dust. Using carbon dating the limestone dust was found to be 10055 years old (plus/minus 195 years).

Flow System 

After the slide most of the water escaped through the upper section of the debris. There are several examples of rivers disappearing in the Alps and also in Scotland. The lakes in the debris area still behave in this way such as Caumasee.
The Ilanz lake existed some 1000 to 2000 years before the water cut through the debris, creating the Gorge.

Sightseeing 

 The place Dutjen above Valendas is opposite and gives a good overview.
 The aerial cableway from Flims onto Cassonsgrat takes you to the tear-off edge of the landslide. There is various hikes to this ridge as well. One route uses the ascent via Val Bargis, probably the nicest ascent although you cannot see the rockslide area before reaching the top.
 The railway line of the Rhätische Bahn crosses Ruinaulta close to river Rhine. Except for access to the railway stations there is no roads into this area and no parking. A footpath goes for two thirds of the gorge, the last bit is being built in 2010/2011. Connections lead out of the gorge.
 In Conn on the debris there is a viewing platform in the shape of a common swift, overlooking Ruinaulta. Walking there you will encounter a little artificial stream that ancient farmers built to get water to some fields in the area as there is no natural surface water.
 There is river rafting on the Rhine.

References

Notes 
Albert Heim: Der alte Bergsturz von Flims 18. Jahrbuch des Schweizer Alpenklub 1882-1883 p. 295-309
 [BERGSTURZ-GEBIETE DER SCHWEIZ, PROFILE] [Kartenmaterial] / Alb. Heim. - Zürich: Kunstanstalt J.C.Müller, Abt.Kartogr.Hofer, 191.. [000450082]
G. Hartung: Das alte Bergsturzgebiet von Flims, Zeitschrift der Gesellschaft für Erdkunde. Berlin (19) 1884
Dr. Julius Weber: Klubführer; Geologische Wanderungen durch die Schweiz (II), 1913 S. 162-173
Seesedimente auf der Flimser Bergsturzmasse: ein neuer Ansatz zur Datierung der grössten Massenbewegung der Alpen (~ 9490 - 9460 cal. y BP): Flims/Laax, Graubünden, Schweiz / Gaudenz Deplazes. Zürich; 2005.. 140 S.: Ill. + 4 Falttaf.. [005083370]
Emil Kirchen: Wenn der Berg stürzt: das Bergsturzbegiet zwischen Chur und Ilanz - Chur [etc.]: Terra Grischuna, cop. 1993. [000943845] 
Zur Hydrogeologie des Bergsturzgebietes im Raum Flims / Y. P. Bonanomi.. . [et al.]. - Bern: Landeshydrologie und -geologie, cop. 1994. (Geologische Berichte / Landeshydrologie und -geologie; Nr. 17) [000955866]
Carl Bieler: Als der Berg runterkam, 2006, Migros-Magazin

External links 
  A.v.Poschinger, Angewandte Geologie, Vol. 10/1, 2005 (PDF-Datei; 1,13 MB)
  S. Plahuta; Review 1999
Naturmonument Ruinaulta

Canyons and gorges of Switzerland
Landforms of Graubünden
Landslides in Switzerland
Alps
Tourist attractions in Graubünden